The Libertarian National Convention is held every two years by the Libertarian Party (United States) to choose members of the Libertarian National Committee (LNC), and to conduct other party business.  In presidential election years, the convention delegates enact a platform and nominate the Libertarian presidential and vice-presidential candidates who then face the nominees of other parties in the November general election.

While most delegates to the Republican National Convention and the Democratic National Convention are tied to particular candidates, delegates to the Libertarian National Convention are free to choose, as was previously the case for the larger parties.  Accordingly, Libertarian National Conventions place less emphasis on festivities and spinning the press, though some of each may be found.  The complete convention is televised by C-SPAN with additional broadcast television coverage of the presidential nominating process. None of the above is always an option on all ballots.

Conventions

1972
The first Libertarian National Convention was held in 1972 in Denver, Colorado. John Hospers and Theodora Nathan were nominated presidential and vice presidential candidates, respectively. The party received the first electoral vote won by a woman, cast by Roger MacBride.

1973
The 1973 Convention was held in Strongsville, Ohio, from June 8 to 10. Over 175 were in attendance.

1974
The 1974 convention adopted the Dallas Accord which sought to accommodate supporters of both anarcho-capitalism and minarchism.

1975
The 1975 convention was held at the Statler-Hilton hotel in New York City. Roger MacBride was nominated for president. After initially selecting None of the Above, the convention's delegates nominated David Bergland for vice president.

1976
The 1976 convention was held in Washington, D.C., from September 23 to 26, 1976.

1977
The 1977 convention was held at the Palace Hotel in San Francisco, California. (More details soon)

1978
The 1978 convention was held at the Copley Plaza Hotel in Boston Massachusetts. (More details soon)

1979
The 1979 convention was held at the Bonaventure Hotel in Los Angeles and nominated Ed Clark for president and billionaire David H. Koch for vice president.

Alternative '80
The 1980 convention was held at the Century City Hotel in Los Angeles, California, and via satellite. Unlike other Libertarian Party conventions, its primary purpose was promotional.

1981
The 1981 convention was held in Denver, Colorado.

1983

David Bergland was selected as the 1984 presidential nominee at the 1983 National Convention.

1985
The 1985 convention was held in Phoenix, Arizona.

1987

The 1987 Libertarian National Convention was held the first weekend in September in Seattle, Washington. At the convention, the party was split between conservative and liberal factions.  Ron Paul, representing the former, was nominated as the Libertarian Party's 1988 presidential candidate on the first ballot with 196 of the 368 votes cast.  His closest opponent, Native American activist Russell Means, received 120 votes.  Andre Marrou was selected as Paul's running mate as the candidate for vice president without opposition.

1989
The 1989 convention was held in Philadelphia, Pennsylvania.

1991

The 1991 Libertarian National Convention was held in Chicago the last weekend in August, and nominated Andre Marrou as the party's 1992 candidate for president.

1993
The 1993 convention was held in Salt Lake City, Utah.

1996

The 1996 Libertarian National Convention was held the first weekend of July in Washington D.C., and nominated Harry Browne as its presidential candidate.

1998
The 1998 convention was held in Washington D.C.

2000

The 2000 convention was held in Anaheim, California, from June 30 to July 4. Harry Browne was again chosen as the party's presidential candidate, becoming the first Libertarian Party candidate to run twice for president of the United States.

2002
The 2002 convention was held in Indianapolis, Indiana, from July 3 to 7.  Key Note Speaker: Dr. Ron Paul.

2004

The 2004 convention was held at the Marriott Marquis Hotel in Atlanta, Georgia, Memorial Day weekend, May 27 to May 31. Michael Badnarik was chosen as the party's presidential candidate, beating out Gary Nolan and Aaron Russo on the third ballot; Richard Campagna was chosen as the party's vice-presidential candidate over Tamara Millay, and Michael Dixon was elected chair of the LNC.

2006
The 2006 convention was held at the Hilton Portland & Executive Tower in Portland, Oregon, July 1–2.  Delegates chose (in a "retain or delete" vote process) to eliminate about three-quarters of the specific planks in the party's platform

Speakers included:
 Michael Badnarik, candidate for U.S. House of Representatives (TX-10) and the 2004 Libertarian presidential candidate
 Judge John A. Buttrick, Maricopa County (Arizona) Superior Court Judge, 1994 Arizona gubernatorial candidate, 1998 Arizona House of Representatives candidate
 Megan Dickson, an eighth-grade honors student who spoke about libertarianism
 Patrick Dixon, city councilman, Lago Vista, Texas
 Bill Lynn, alderman, Davenport, Iowa
 Tonie Nathan, former Libertarian vice-presidential candidate, and the first woman to receive an electoral vote in U.S. history
 BetteRose Ryan, at-large LNC member
 Rev. Anthony Williams, candidate for U.S. House of Representatives (IL-2)
 Former Congressman Bob Barr, who has served as the chairman of Patriots to Restore Checks and Balances
 Andrew Neil, founding chairman of Sky TV, former publisher of The Scotsman, former editor of The Economist and former editor-in-chief of the Sunday Times
 Christopher J. Farrell, member of the Judicial Watch's board of directors
 Greg Nojeim, associate director and chief legislative counsel for the ACLU
 Krist Novoselic, founding member of the Seattle-based grunge rock band Nirvana, founder JAMPAC (Joint Artists and Music Promotions Political Action Committee), author of Of Grunge and Government: Let's Fix This Broken Democracy

2008

The 2008 convention was held at the Sheraton Denver Downtown Hotel (formerly the Adam's Mark Hotel) in Denver, Colorado (the same city as the very first convention in 1972), May 23–26.

2010

The 2010 convention was held in St. Louis, Missouri, from Friday, May 28, to Monday, May 31.

2012

The 2012 convention was held in Las Vegas, Nevada, May 4–6, 2012.

2014

The 2014 convention was held in Columbus, Ohio, during the last weekend in June.

2016

The 2016 convention was held in Orlando, Florida, during the last weekend in May.

2018

The 2018 convention was held from June 30 to July 3 in New Orleans, Louisiana. Nicholas Sarwark was reelected as chair, Alex Merced elected as vice chair, Caryn Ann Harlos elected as secretary, Tim Hagan reelected as treasurer, new at-large members were selected, and a new four-year term Judicial Committee was elected.

2020

The 2020 convention was scheduled to be held in Austin, Texas, over Memorial Day weekend, but that was canceled via the enactment of their impossibility clause. Nomination business for president and vice president and potentially, confirmation of the in-person convention, was to be done virtually on Friday, May 22, with ratification to take place sometime in early July. That alternate venue was set by the Libertarian National Committee for Orlando, Florida, the host city of the 2016 Libertarian National Convention.

2022

The 2022 convention was held on Memorial Day weekend from May 26 to 29 in Reno, Nevada.

2024
The 2024 convention is scheduled to be held on Memorial Day weekend from May 24 to 26, 2024 in Washington, D.C.

List of Libertarian conventions
The following is a list of United States Libertarian Party Presidential nominating conventions.

References